FIRST Overdrive was the 2008 game for the FIRST Robotics Competition, announced on January 5, 2008.  In it, teams competed to complete counterclockwise laps around a central barrier while manipulating large  diameter  "Trackballs" over and under overpasses to score additional points.

Game Overview
The fence is crossed by an  overpass marking the red and blue finish lines, and hold the game pieces:  diameter inflated balls called "Trackballs". Two three-team alliances race around the track in a counter clockwise direction while manipulating the trackballs to score points.

The game is made up of two scoring periods. The first 15 seconds of play is the Hybrid period in which robots are autonomous, and may also respond to certain digital signals sent by team members designated as "Robocoaches", who are stationed at the corners of the track.

The next two minutes of play is the Teleoperated period. At this time, robots are fully radio controlled by the team operators standing at either end of the field.

Scoring 
During the Hybrid period, robots traveling in a counter clockwise direction score: 
8 points for each of their Trackballs knocked off of the overpass
8 points for each of their Trackballs passed over the overpass
4 points whenever their robot crosses a lane marker
4 points whenever their robot crosses their opponent's finish line
4 points whenever their robot crosses their finish line
2 points whenever their trackball crosses their finish line
During the Teleoperated period, robots traveling in a counter clockwise direction score:
2 points whenever their robot crosses their finish line
2 points whenever their Trackball crosses their finish line
8 points whenever their Trackball hurdles their overpass
Alliances score an additional 12 points for each of their Trackballs that are positioned anywhere on the overpass at the end of the match.

Hybrid period 
Hybrid period is a new addition to an FRC game.  Rather than the pre-game autonomous modes of previous years where robots were prohibited from receiving input from humans, robots may receive signals via an infrared (IR) remote control or visible light from a designated Robocoach during the Hybrid period. The number of different IR signals the IR board included in the kit of parts is physically able to receive is 4. The number of distinct commands that are allowed to be sent is also 4, thus ruling out multi-signal combinations.

Competition schedule 
 Kickoff — January 5, 2008
 Shipping deadline — February 19, 2008 
 Regional competitions — weekends, February 28, 2008 – April 6, 2008 
 Championship — April 17, 2008 – April 19, 2008

Events
The following regional events were held in 2008:
 Arizona Regional - Phoenix
 BAE Systems Granite State Regional - Manchester, NH
 Bayou Regional - New Orleans
 Boilermaker Regional - West Lafayette, IN
 Boston Regional - Boston
 Brazil Regional - Sao Jose dos Campos, Brazil
 Buckeye Regional - Cleveland, OH
 Chesapeake Regional - Annapolis, MD
 Colorado Regional - Denver
 Connecticut Regional - Hartford, CT
 Detroit Regional - Detroit
 Finger Lakes Regional - Rochester, NY
 Florida Regional - Orlando
 Great Lakes Regional - Ypsilanti, MI
 Greater Kansas City Regional - Kansas City, MO
 Greater Toronto Regional - Mississauga, ON
 Hawaii Regional - Manoa Valley, HI
 Israel Regional - Tel Aviv, Israel
 Las Vegas Regional - Las Vegas
 Lone Star Regional - Katy, TX
 Microsoft Seattle Regional - Tacoma, WA
 Midwest Regional - Chicago
 Minnesota Regional - Minneapolis
 NASA/VCU Regional - Richmond, VA
 New Jersey Regional - Trenton, NJ
 New York City Regional - New York City
 Oklahoma City Regional - Oklahoma City
 Oregon Regional - Portland
 Palmetto Regional - Clemson, SC
 Peachtree Regional - Duluth, GA
 Philadelphia Regional - Philadelphia
 Pittsburgh Regional - Pittsburgh
 St. Louis Regional - St. Charles, MO
 San Diego Regional - San Diego
 SBPLI Long Island Regional - Hempstead, NY
 Silicon Valley Regional - San Jose, CA
 Southern California Regional - Los Angeles
 UC Davis Sacramento Regional - Davis, CA
 Waterloo Regional - Waterloo, ON
 West Michigan Regional - Allendale, MI
 Wisconsin Regional - Milwaukee

The championship was held in the Georgia Dome, Atlanta.

References

2008 in robotics
FIRST Robotics Competition games